Gail R. Wilensky (born June 14, 1943) is an American health economist who has worked for Republican administrations and candidacies.

Life
Wilensky headed Medicare under the first president Bush and works at Project HOPE. She received an honorary degree from New York Institute of Technology.

She received a bachelor's degree in psychology and a PhD in economics at the University of Michigan.

She currently serves as an external advisory board member for the University of Pennsylvania's Center for Health Incentives & Behavioral Economics (CHIBE).

References

External links
GailWilensky.com
WHO Profile

1943 births
Living people
21st-century American economists
Health economists
20th-century American Jews
University of Michigan College of Literature, Science, and the Arts alumni
21st-century American Jews
Members of the National Academy of Medicine